The Aloha 28 is a Canadian sailboat, that was designed by Edward S. Brewer and Robert Walstrom and first built in 1972.

The Aloha 28 design was developed into the Aloha 8.5 in 1983.

The Aloha 28 should not be confused with the Aloa 28, the successor to the Aloa 27 that has been built by the French shipyard Aloa Marine since 1972.

Production
The boat was built by Ouyang Boat Works in Whitby, Ontario, Canada under its Aloha Yachts brand between 1972 and 1988, but it is now out of production.

Design

The Aloha 28 is a small recreational keelboat, built predominantly of fiberglass, with wood trim. It has a  masthead sloop rig, a raked stem, a vertical transom, a transom-hung rudder mounted on a skeg and a fixed swept fin keel. It displaces  and carries  of ballast.

Several masts and rigs were supplied during the course of production, including a tall masted version, with a mast about  taller than standard.

With the tall mast fitted the design has a PHRF racing average handicap of 195 with a high of 202 and low of 192.

Operational history
In a review Michael McGoldrick wrote, "The Aloha 28 was designed by Ted Brewer, a Canadian who has gained a considerable reputation for drawing some serious cruising boats. The Aloha 28 certainly qualifies on this count. Although Aloha wasn't designed for racing, a long waterline makes it a fast boat. It also had a long production run, stretching from the early 1970s to the mid 1980s ... In its final years of production, this boat was also marketed as the Aloha 8.5. The Aloha 8.5 had a different window configuration and a better forward hatch."

See also
List of sailing boat types

Similar sailboats
Alerion Express 28
Beneteau First 285
Beneteau Oceanis 281
Bristol Channel Cutter
Cal 28
Catalina 28
Crown 28
Cumulus 28
Grampian 28
Hunter 28
Hunter 28.5
Hunter 280
J/28
Laser 28
O'Day 28
Pearson 28
Sabre 28
Sea Sprite 27
Sirius 28
Tanzer 8.5
Tanzer 28
TES 28 Magnam
Viking 28

References

External links

Keelboats
1970s sailboat type designs
Sailing yachts
Sailboat type designs by Edward S. Brewer
Sailboat type designs by Robert Walstrom
Sailboat types built by Ouyang Boat Works